A Day in Ostrobothnia is a 1985 novel by Finnish author Antti Tuuri. It won the Nordic Council's Literature Prize in 1985.

References

1985 novels
20th-century Finnish novels
Finnish-language novels
Nordic Council's Literature Prize-winning works